Whitehall is a Northside suburb of Dublin City, Ireland.

Whitehall is a residential area on the northern outskirts of Dublin's inner city, located near the M1 motorway leading to Dublin Airport, Swords and Belfast.  It's situated between the suburbs of Santry, Drumcondra and Glasnevin. North of Whitehall, the M1 motorway begins at its junction with the M50, past the Dublin Port Tunnel's northern entrance. The area is adjacent to the major public Beaumont Hospital and to Dublin City University on Collins Avenue.

Etymology
Whitehall takes its name from a house named White Hall, formerly located to the south of the village on Drumcondra Road Upper. The area commonly known as Whitehall Cross, at the intersection of the Swords Road (R132) (north-south) and Collins Avenue (east-west), is in the townland of Clonturk, and was formerly the site of a public house called The Thatch, the memory of which is preserved in the name of a nearby road.

Education
Whitehall College of Further Education is situated on the old site of Whitehall House. Whitehall College was originally named Whitehall House Secretarial School when it was established in 1970 but has since changed its name to Whitehall College of Further Education to reflects its provision of courses. The college has moved to Mobhi Road from its Swords Road building.

Also in the area are Plunket College of Further Education and St. Aidan's Christian Brothers School (whose past pupils include the former Irish Taoiseach, Bertie Ahern and the international footballer Liam Brady), and the Holy Child Girls national school, designed by Robinson and Keefe Architects. The Holy Child boys National School is a similar building designed by the same Architects. Margret Aylward School is a girls secondary school beside Ellenfield park and Whitehall church.

Churches
The Roman Catholic Church of the Holy Child, parish of Whitehall-Larkhill-Santry (often called Whitehall Church) is a large redbrick church designed by John Robinson of Robinson Keefe and Devane Architects which is a well-known landmark to travellers on the N1. The tower, when viewed from Home Farm, is carefully located to stand on the top of a hill on the axis of the road leaving the city. This church is similar in many respects to Galway Cathedral designed by the same Architect. Before the opening of the Church in Whitehall, the area was served by a temporary church in Larkhill, known as the Tin Church.

Sporting
National sporting interests are represented by Whitehall Colmcille GAA club from which former All Ireland medal winners Tommy Drumm, Paul Clarke, Paddy Moran and Declan McGrath emanated from. The club is the largest juvenile sporting body in the community here providing Gaelic football, ladies football, Hurling and Camogie to girls and boys from 4 yrs of age up to adult. The area also houses the home ground of prominent junior football club Home Farm F.C., and St. Kevin's Boys F.C., the schoolboy club for which Liam Brady, Ian Harte, Stephen Carr and Damien Duff played. Whitehall is also the site for one of the interchanges for the Dublin Port Tunnel with the M1. Dubliners band member Luke Kelly also lived in Whitehall and there is a stone in the area dedicated to him.
Whitehall Colmcille's Clubhouse on Collin's Ave, was a former tennis club (Thorndale), and the club uses Ellenfield Park for its games, the Club have developed new pitches at Whitehall Cross on land formerly a farm but was used for the construction of the Port Tunnel.

Whitehall Rangers A.F.C. are a soccer club in the area. Whitehall Rangers Ladies are playing intermediate football. Whitehall Celtic is a football club which is an Athletic Union League team based in from the area.

Dublin Archers practice in Plunket College grounds in Whitehall.

The Whitehall Stadium is in Whitehall, Dublin, which borders Drumcondra and is home to the club Home Farm.

People
 Luke Kelly, a member of The Dubliners lived in Whitehall during his childhood. In September 1988 a monument was erected to commemorate Kelly in the Larkhill area of Whitehalll.

History

Civil War
In the aftermath of the killing of Michael Collins on 25 August 1922 retaliatory killings occurred in Whitehall. Two Anti-Treaty Republicans Alfie (Leo) Colley (20), and Sean Cole (18), members of Fianna Éireann, were abducted by Free State forces at the  North Strand. Witnesses saw them being shot dead at 'The Thatch', Puck's Lane or Yellow Lane, (now Yellow Road) in Whitehall. There is a small commemoration stone on Yellow Road to Cole and Colley. This was unveiled in December 1926 by Countess Markiewicz in front of a crowd of 800.

Another site in Whitehall from the Civil war is the Memorial stone to Martin Hogan on Grace Park Road whose body was found dumped there on the 22 August 1923.

Whitehall Grand Cinema
The Whitehall Grand Cinema opened in July 1954 on Collins Ave., seating 1000 patrons, it was used as a bingo while still a cinema, it ceased functioning as a cinema in 1974, and was purchased by Gael Linn who operated it as a bingo hall. It still serves as a bingo hall to this day.

See also
List of towns in the Republic of Ireland

References

Towns and villages in Dublin (city)